Compsolechia diplolychna is a moth of the family Gelechiidae. It was described by Edward Meyrick in 1922. It is found in Pará, Brazil.

The wingspan is about 16 mm. The forewings are purple blackish with a broad deep orange fascia at about two-thirds, leaving the costal edge dark fuscous. There are deep metallic-blue pointed streaks from its posterior edge near the extremities rather converging and not reaching the anterior edge. The hindwings are blackish, with a thinly scaled white blotch in the disc before the middle.

References

Moths described in 1922
Compsolechia
Taxa named by Edward Meyrick